Yarmouth School Department is a school district in Yarmouth, Maine. The schools are: William H. Rowe School (grades K–1), Yarmouth Elementary School (grades 2–4), Harrison Middle School (grades 5–8), and the Yarmouth High School (grades 9–12). For more information for students of Yarmouth look in the student handbook (2006–2007). Their mascot is the clipper ship.

List of schools

Yarmouth High School is in a newly finished and renovated building. There were about 495 students enrolled in 2012. Ninety percent of seniors go on to college and university studies. There are 52 teachers including all counselors, social workers, special educators, and technology specialists. Yarmouth High School has a reputation as one of the best high schools in the state of Maine.
Frank H. Harrison Middle School employs around 75 people. The school colors are navy blue and white.
William H. Rowe School is a two-grade primary school.

Grading scale
In Yarmouth students start receiving grades in the 7th grade. Grades are on a 100-point scale:

References

External links

Education in Yarmouth, Maine
School districts in Maine